State Road 584 (NM 584), also known as Fairview Lane, is a  east–west state highway in northern Española, New Mexico, United States, that connects U.S. Route 84/U.S. Route 285 (US 84/US 285) with New Mexico State Road 68 (NM 68).

Route description
NM 584 begins at a signal-controlled intersection with US 84/US 285 (North Paseo De Ontate) in northwestern Española. (From the intersection Industrial Park Road heads west to the westernmost part of the city. US 84/US 285 heads northerly toward Tierra Amarilla and Chama and southerly to connect with NM 68, then on toward El Valle de Arroyo Seco, Pojoaque and Santa Fe.) Roughly  farther east, NM 584 connects with North Railroad Avenue (which heads south to end at US 84/US 285) and promptly narrows to a two-lane road. Approximately  beyond that intersection, NM 584 crosses the Rio Grande. About  later, NM 584 connects with the west end of Riley Road (which heads northeasterly to end at NM 68) and then gains an eastbound lane. After roughly  more, NM 584, reaches its eastern terminus at signal-controlled intersection with NM 68 (North Riverside Drive) in the Fairview neighborhood of Española. (From the intersection East Fairview Lane continues east to end at New Mexico State Road 291. NM 68 heads north toward Velarde, Embudo, and Taos and south to end US 84/US 285, which continues southerly toward El Valle de Arroyo Seco, Pojoaque, and Santa Fe.)

Traffic

The New Mexico Department of Transportation (NMDOT) collects data for the State Roads and Local Federal-Aid roads. Traffic is measured in both directions and reported as Annual Average Daily Traffic (AADT). , NM 584 had an AADT of 16,955, with a nearly 14 percent increase in traffic over the previous two years.

History

Major intersections

See also

 List of state roads in New Mexico

Notes

References

External links

584
Transportation in Rio Arriba County, New Mexico
Española, New Mexico